James Morris Whiton Hall (September 28, 1842 – December 6, 1926)  was a Massachusetts businessman and politician who served as the Mayor of Cambridge, Massachusetts.

Notes

1842 births
1926 deaths
Mayors of Cambridge, Massachusetts
Cambridge, Massachusetts City Council members
Massachusetts Republicans
Boston Latin School alumni